Isoti is a village in Pauri Garhwal district of Uttarakhand.

As per 2011 stats, Isoti is the gram panchayat of Isoti village.

Geography
The nearby market is Tunakhal and main market is Satpuli.

Religious shrines
The famous local temple is Deeba Mandir, dedicated to goddess Deeba (considered preserver of forest).

Demography
As per the census of 2011, Isoti has a population of 397.

Sex ratio:1068
Literacy:82.1
Households:82
Sc Population:7
Males:192
Females:205
The child sex ratio is 957 which is higher than Uttarakhand of 890.
The sex ratio of Isoti is 1068,which is higher than Uttarakhand of 963.

References

Villages in Pauri Garhwal district